Mohamed Moge District is a district in Hargeisa, Somaliland. It is one of the eight administrative districts of Hargeisa City. and is named after the famous singer Mohamed Moge Liban.

See also

References

Districts of Hargeisa